Bogofa is a town in north-eastern Ivory Coast. It is a sub-prefecture of Nassian Department in Bounkani Region, Zanzan District.

Bogofa was a commune until March 2012, when it became one of 1126 communes nationwide that were abolished.

In 2013, the Hadja Ouattara Nabintou Cissé Mosque was opened in the town.

In 2014, the population of the sub-prefecture of Bogofa was 5,486.

Villages
The three villages of the sub-prefecture of Bogofa and their population in 2014 are:
 Bodé (1 527)
 Farako (2 492)
 Gouméré (1 467)

Notes

Sub-prefectures of Bounkani
Former communes of Ivory Coast